The Pawnee language is a Caddoan language traditionally spoken by Pawnee Native Americans, currently inhabiting north-central Oklahoma. Historically, the Pawnee lived along the Platte River in what is now Nebraska.

Dialects
Two important dialect divisions are evident in Pawnee: South Band and Skiri. The distinction between the two dialects rests on differences in their respective phonetic inventory and lexicon.

Status
Prior to colonization and US expansion, Pawnee was spoken by all members of the Nation. Today Pawnee is only spoken fluently by a shrinking number of elderly speakers. As more young people shift to English as their first language, the transmission of Pawnee and its vitality are seriously endangered.

As of 2007, the Pawnee Nation is developing teaching materials for the local high school and for adult language classes. There are also extensive documentary materials in the language archived at the American Indian Studies Research Institute. The Pawnee language can be heard spoken in the 2015 movie The Revenant. In 2019 and 2020, the Pawnee Nation has posted online videos teaching the Pawnee language.

Phonology
The following describes the South Band dialect.

Consonants
Pawnee has eight consonant phonemes, and according to one analysis of medial- and final-position glottal stops, one may posit a ninth consonant phoneme.

   is predictable when it occurs in the middle of words. However, since  is not completely predictable at the end of words, it may also need to be considered a phoneme.

Vowels

Pawnee has four short vowel phonemes and four long counterparts (also phonemic).

Morphology
Pawnee is an ergative-absolutive polysynthetic language.

Alphabet
The Pawnee alphabet has 9 consonants and 8 vowels. The letters are relatively similar in pronunciation to their English counterparts.

Consonants

Vowels

Notes

References
American Indian Studies Research Institute. (2008). Dictionary Database: Pawnee (Skiri and Southband dialects).
American Indian Studies Research Institute. (2001). Pawnee Alphabet Book.
 Mithun, Marianne. (1999). The languages of Native North America. Cambridge: Cambridge University Press.  (hbk); .
 Parks, Douglas R. (1976). A grammar of Pawnee. New York: Garland.
 Taylor, Allan R. (1978). [Review of A grammar of Pawnee by D. Parks]. Language, 54 (4), 969-972.

External links

 Pawnee Language Program, sponsored by the Pawnee Nation and Indiana University

Pawnee
Indigenous languages of the North American Plains
Caddoan languages
Polysynthetic languages
Indigenous languages of Oklahoma
Endangered Caddoan languages
Endangered indigenous languages of the Americas